Johnny Johnson may refer to:

People

Sports
 Johnny Johnson (baseball) (1914–1991), Major League pitcher
 Johnny A. Johnson (born 1915), American Negro leagues baseball player
 Johnny Johnson (footballer) (1921–2003), British footballer
 Johnny Johnson (American football) (born 1968), American football player
 Johnny Johnson III (born 1999), American Football Player

Military
 Johnny Johnson (British Army officer) (died 1944), British Army officer
 Johnny Johnson (RAF officer) (1921–2022), last survivor of Operation Chastise
 Harold Keith Johnson (1912–1983), United States Army general

Other people
 Johnny Johnson (philatelist) (1884–1966), British stamp dealer and philatelist
 Johnny Johnson, headliner of Johnny Johnson and the Bandwagon

Other uses
 Johnny Johnson (musical), a 1936 musical by Kurt Weill
 Johnny Johnson, a character on NewsRadio played by Patrick Warburton

See also
John Johnson (disambiguation)
Johnnie Johnson (disambiguation)
Johnny Johnston (disambiguation)